Mauro Edward Zárate (born February 8, 1983 in Valencia, Venezuela) is a former professional baseball pitcher. He pitched part of the 2007 season in Major League Baseball for the Florida Marlins.

Zárate was called up on August 3, 2007, by the Marlins and played his first game on August 7 against the Philadelphia Phillies. On October 26, 2007, Zárate was claimed off waivers by the San Diego Padres from the Marlins. He became a free agent at the end of the 2008 season and signed a minor league contract with the Cleveland Indians, but never pitched in their organization.

See also
 List of Major League Baseball players from Venezuela

External links
, or Retrosheet, or Pura Pelota (VPBL stats)

1983 births
Living people
Albuquerque Isotopes players
Bravos de Margarita players
Carolina Mudcats players
Florida Marlins players
Greensboro Bats players
Greensboro Grasshoppers players
Gulf Coast Marlins players
Jamestown Jammers players
Jupiter Hammerheads players
Leones del Caracas players
Major League Baseball pitchers
Major League Baseball players from Venezuela
Sportspeople from Valencia, Venezuela
Portland Beavers players
San Antonio Missions players
Tigres de Aragua players
Venezuelan expatriate baseball players in the United States